Salvador del Mundo (28 October 1902 – 13 February 1945) was a Filipino chemist specializing in ceramics. Born in Boac, Marinduque, del Mundo graduated, summa cum laude, with a degree in chemistry from the University of the Philippines in 1925, and obtained a doctorate degree from the University of Santo Tomas in 1934. His scientific career led him to become the lead chemist of the ceramics laboratory of the government Bureau of Science, which is now the Department of Science and Technology, production manager of the Ceramics Industries of the Philippines, and professorships at the University of the Philippines and the University of Santo Tomas. Del Mundo also became a member of the German Ceramics Society and the Philippine Scientific Society.

References 

1902 births
1945 deaths
Filipino chemists
University of Santo Tomas alumni
Academic staff of the University of Santo Tomas
Academic staff of the University of the Philippines